3-Keto-5α-abiraterone, also known as 17-(3-pyridyl)-5α-androst-16-en-3-one, is an active metabolite of abiraterone acetate that has been found to possess androgenic activity and to stimulate prostate cancer progression. It is formed as follows: abiraterone acetate to abiraterone by esterases; abiraterone to Δ4-abiraterone by 3β-hydroxysteroid dehydrogenase/Δ5-4 isomerase; and Δ4-abiraterone to 3-keto-5α-abiraterone by 5α-reductase. 3-Keto-5α-abiraterone may counteract the clinical effectiveness of abiraterone acetate, and so inhibition of its formation using the 5α-reductase inhibitor dutasteride is being investigated as an adjunct to abiraterone acetate in the treatment of prostate cancer.

References

Androgens and anabolic steroids
Androstanes
Human drug metabolites
Ketones
Prostate cancer
3-Pyridyl compounds